Gulod station is a proposed railway station located on the South Main Line in Laguna, Philippines. It is planned to be situated in between the existing Cabuyao and Mamatid stations. This PNR station is proposed by the JICA for both the current Metro Commuter and the South Line of the North-South Commuter Rail Project.

References

Philippine National Railways stations
Railway stations in Laguna (province)
Buildings and structures in Cabuyao